Rogelia Cruz Martínez (31 August 1940 – 11 January 1968) was a Guatemalan beauty queen and left-wing political activist. After she won the 1958 Miss Guatemala title, she joined the Guatemalan Party of Labour and became romantically involved with its leader, Leonardo Castillo Johnson. She was ultimately kidnapped and murdered for her association with the party and Johnson.

Biography

Early life and pageantry 
Cruz was born into a middle-class family in Guatemala City on 31 August 1940, the daughter of Miguel Ángel Cruz Franco and Blanca Martínez Flores. While born in the Guatemalan capital, her family was originally from Chiquimula. As a young adult, attended the Instituto Normal Central para Señoritas Belén, a secondary school that specializes in training future teachers, and went onto study architecture at the Universidad de San Carlos de Guatemala. It was during her time at university that she won the Miss Guatemala pageant. She went onto compete in the Miss Universe pageant in Long Beach, California the following year in 1959, but ultimately lost the title to Akiko Kojima of Japan. Following her success in pageantry, in 1962, Cruz joined a guerrilla front and, in 1965, she was arrested for storing weapons at her family's farm. After being released from prison, she joined the Juventud Patriotica del Trabajo (JPT) and became romantically involved with Leonardo Castillo Johnson, the leader of the Partido Guatemalteco del Trabajo (PGT).

Murder 
Cruz was arrested following a traffic violation but was released after the PGT and Fuerzas Armadas Rebeldes (FAR) made threats towards the judge presiding over her case. Shortly after her release, she was kidnapped and then, on 11 January 1968, her body was found, naked, with signs of torture and sexual assault, at the foot of a bridge near Escuintla. It is believed her relationship with Castillo Johnson was the cause for her murder.

Aftermath 
In retaliation for her murder, the PGT attacked US military personnel, killing two men and wounding a third, and the Guatemalan military subsequently assassinated Castillo Johnson in response.

References 

1940 births
1968 deaths
Guatemalan activists
Guatemalan murder victims
Miss Guatemala winners
Miss Universe 1959 contestants
People murdered in Guatemala
Place of birth missing
Violence against women in Guatemala